Rabensburg is a town in the district of Mistelbach in the Austrian state of Lower Austria.

Population

References

Cities and towns in Mistelbach District